Strizivojna–Vrpolje railway station is a railway station on Novska–Tovarnik railway. Located between two settlement Strizivojna and Vrpolje. Railroad continued to Andrijevci in one, in the other direction to Stari Mikanovci, in third direction to Đakovo and the fourth direction towards to Kopanica–Beravci. Strizivojna–Vrpolje railway station consists of 10 railway track.

See also 
 Croatian Railways
 Zagreb–Belgrade railway

References 

Railway stations in Croatia